The Nevada State Railroad Museum, located in Carson City, Nevada, preserves the railroad heritage of Nevada, including locomotives and cars of the famous Virginia and Truckee Railroad.  Much of the museum equipment was obtained from various Hollywood studios, where they were used in movies and television.  The museum is operated by the Nevada Department of Tourism and Cultural Affairs.   Opened in 1980, it was originally named the Virginia & Truckee Railroad Museum, often shortened to V&T Railroad Museum, but was renamed the Nevada State Railroad Museum in 1985.

Museum activities consist of operation of historic  and  narrow gauge railroad equipment, including train rides, handcar rides, lectures, an annual railroad history symposium, changing exhibits, and a variety of special events.  The Museum also has an ongoing research and restoration program. The museum's current exhibit commemorates the 150th anniversary of the completion of the First transcontinental railroad, featuring V&T Coach No. 17, which was originally built for the Central Pacific Railroad and had carried Leland Stanford to the Golden spike ceremony at Promontory Summit, Utah.
The Wabuska Depot, a historic station from Wabuska, Nevada was relocated to the museum grounds.  The building is still used as a working railroad station where tickets for the museum train rides are purchased.

Collection

Standard gauge steam locomotives

Narrow gauge steam locomotives

Motor locomotives

Motorcars

See also
 Nevada State Railroad Museum Boulder City – a museum located in Boulder City, Nevada.

References

External links

 Nevada State Railroad Museum

1980 establishments in Nevada
Museums established in 1980
Museums in Carson City, Nevada
Railroad museums in Nevada